South Granville Congregational Church and Parsonage is a historic church and parsonage at 7179 NY 149 in Granville, New York.

It was started in 1843 and was added to the National Register in 2005.

References

Congregational churches in New York (state)
Churches on the National Register of Historic Places in New York (state)
Gothic Revival church buildings in New York (state)
Churches completed in 1843
Churches in Washington County, New York
1843 establishments in New York (state)
Houses on the National Register of Historic Places in New York (state)
National Register of Historic Places in Washington County, New York